Munia Islam  is a Bangladeshi model, TV presenter and film actress. She has worked in film Swapnajaal (2018). Munia Islam was much appreciated with Swapnajaal film.  She also has worked in many Bangla TV dramas. Her notable works include Bou Boka Dei, Third Generation, Tumi Ashbe Boley, Sutoy Bandha Sukher Paira, Off Screen, Mayar Khela, Ujan Ganger Naiya, Nil Akasher Kalo Rong, Three Comrade. She was a hostess on two shows on Channel I - Gaan Diye Sokal Shuru and Cinemar Gaan in 2020.

Personal life 
In late 2020, Munia Islam, a popular face on the small screen, married Azwad Haider.

Early life 
Munia born to Nazrul Islam and Hasina Akter. After completion HSC she started doing photoshoots and TV commercials.

Career 
Munia Islam started working in the media through photoshoots and TV commercials. Her first TVC was for BSRM, then for Dabur Network. She also did TVCs for Bloop Ice on four of their launches. She started individual projects in 2011. In 2012, she started acting in Agnipath Which is her first drama. It was a mega-serial by Nima Rahman. After that she played in many dramas, but the movie Swapnajaal by Giasuddin Selim, where she acted as Julekha, has brought her in big screen. Munia appears in several TV shows as an anchor. She mostly does live musical program: Walton Asian music on Asian TV, Gaan die Shuru on Channel I, Rock Carnival and Rock n Rolls on and many other programs.

Filmography
Swapnajaal, is a Bangladeshi dramatic and romantic movie released in 2018. This film was written and directed by Giasuddin Selim. Munia Islam acted this movie. This film got highly acclaimed by critics and audience.

Television drama

TV commercials

TV programs

References

External links
 Munia Islam
 Munia Islam
 Stylish Munia by NTV
নতুন মেয়ে মুনিয়া (Bengali)

Living people
1996 births
Bangladeshi film actresses